The Sleeman Centre (also known as Sleeman Sports Complex) is a sporting and entertainment facility located in Brisbane, Queensland, Australia. Construction of the centre was completed in 1982. The centre currently offers a range of services to the public, including indoor and outdoor community activities such as swimming, diving, health and fitness classes, a gymnasium, childcare facilities, and a children's pool and water slide.

History
The Sleeman Sports Centre, named after Brisbane Lord Mayor Frank Sleeman, was purpose-built for the 1982 Commonwealth Games. Since then, the centre has been host to a number of other sporting events including the 1994 World Masters Games and the 2001 Goodwill Games swimming, diving, and cycling events. The facilities were to host six sporting events as part of the failed 1992 Olympic bid. During the 2013 Queensland floods, the site was set up as an evacuation facility.

Facilities

Aquatic Centre

The Brisbane Aquatic Centre (located at Chandler) consists of four main swimming pools, a 50-metre indoor Olympic pool (2m depth), a 50-metre outdoor Olympic pool (4m to 2m in depth) a 25-metre diving pool (5m depth), and a 25-metre lap pool (1m depth). The aquatic centre has a seating capacity of 4,300 and has diving facilities, and a moveable bulkhead on the Olympic pool for short course events and a water fun park.

The aquatic centre also contains a children's facility which encompasses the 25-metre lap pool, a large enclosed water slide and a children's pool. All facilities are open to the public, while the main aquatic centre is the venue for many sporting events and may be hired by schools and other organisations.

Following is a summary of the Aquatic Centre's notable features

Anna Meares Velodrome

The Anna Meares Velodrome is a  indoor velodrome, named in honour of Anna Meares, that was completed in 2016. The velodrome hosted the track cycling events at the 2018 Commonwealth Games, and will host the 2032 Summer Olympics.

An older facility, called the Chandler Velodrome, still stands, and was an outdoor configuration, having a grandstand seating capacity of 3,000. The venue was suitable for cycling events, rock concerts, rallies, motocross and speedway championships. Apart from an Olympic standard cycling track, the venue also had a private lounge and function area, omega timing equipment and scoreboard, catering facilities, and lighting for night functions and events. The Norm Gailey Grandstand on the western side also contained offices of AusCycling Queensland, the peak body for cycling in Queensland.

Chandler Theatre

The Chandler Theatre is one of the largest in South East Queensland, with a 200 square metre stage, and a seating capacity of 1,500. Each seat has an unobstructed stage view due to the tiered floor plan. Other facilities include large back-stage areas, computerised stage lighting, meeting rooms, state-of-the-art sound system, box office, refreshment bar and a corporate viewing area and boardroom. The venue is used for such events as graduations, conventions, awards ceremonies, product launches, seminars and concerts.

State weightlifting centre
All venues are within walking distance of the car parks which contain a total 2,020 parking spaces (2,000 regular and 20 disabled). The car-parks also contain lighting for night time use.

Brisbane BMX Supercross Track 

Sleeman Sports Complex is home to Australia's only Olympic Standard BMX Supercross Track.

Water Ramp
In 2020, a water ramp facility for freestyle ski-jumping was completed.  It provides a year-long training facility for Australia's elite aerial skiers. The project was a joint initiative of the Olympic Winter Institute of Australia, state and federal governments and the Australian Olympic Committee.

Services

 Accommodation (seven 3-star, 4-bedroom units available)
 Poolside Café
 Catering (located onsite for in-house events and functions) 
 Retail (Chandler swim shop)
 Childcare (Puddle Ducks Adjunct Child Care)
 Sports Medicine (physiotherapy, radiology, massage, rehabilitation exercise programs)
 Chandler Markets (every Sunday, 7am-1pm. Over 300 stalls, live jazz bands, barbecue)
 Public Transport Park'n'Ride Facility (to be connected to the proposed Eastern Busway)

Tenants and clubs

Aquatic

Other Sport

See also

List of Absolute Championship Akhmat events
List of cycling tracks and velodromes
List of stadiums in Oceania
Sport in Brisbane
Sport in Queensland

References

External links
Venue website

Sports venues in Brisbane
1982 Commonwealth Games venues
2018 Commonwealth Games venues
Velodromes in Australia
Boxing venues in Australia
Volleyball venues in Australia
Sports venues completed in 1982
1982 establishments in Australia
Commonwealth Games swimming venues
Venues of the 2032 Summer Olympics and Paralympics
Track cycling at the 2018 Commonwealth Games
Sports complexes in Australia